B.H. College is an undergraduate college established in the year 1966 at Howly of Barpeta district in Assam. The college is affiliated to Gauhati University.The college also offers M.Com Regular course under GU.

Accreditation
In 2016 the college has been awarded "A" grade with CGPA 3.11 by National Assessment and Accreditation Council. The college is also recognised by University Grants Commission (India).

References

External links

Colleges affiliated to Gauhati University
Universities and colleges in Assam
Barpeta district
Educational institutions established in 1966
1966 establishments in Assam